For the early American colonist of the same name see List of Jamestown colonists

Hugh Wynne was a popular American novel by Silas Weir Mitchell, who was also a medical doctor, published in 1897. The story is recounted in autobiographical form from the perspective of an American patriot during the American Revolution who has a strict father. He eventually serves under General George Washington and has various adventures as well as a love interest playing out during the Revolutionary War era. The Bookman reported it to be the secondmost-bestselling  book in America for 1898.

Much of the book takes place in Philadelphia.  The Bookman gave the book high praise.

The book was first serialized in The Century from November 1896 through October 1897.

The full title of the book is Hugh Wynne, Free Quaker, Sometime Brevet Lieutenant-Colonel on the Staff of His Excellency General Washington.

See also
Publishers Weekly list of bestselling novels in the United States in the 1890s

References

1897 American novels
Novels set in Philadelphia